Hosfelt Gallery in San Francisco, California was founded in 1996 by Todd Hosfelt to exhibit contemporary international artists working in all media.

History
Hosfelt Gallery was founded by Todd Hosfelt in 1996, at 95 Federal Street in San Francisco, adjacent to the visual arts residency program Capp Street Project. In 1999 the gallery moved to a  space in San Francisco's South of Market neighborhood on 430 Clementina Street. Designed in 1999 by Fougeron Architecture and Endres Ware Engineers, the architect was awarded for her work on the space.

In 2006, the gallery opened an additional venue, a  space at 531 West 36th Street, in Manhattan. In 2012 the gallery expanded to a new  San Francisco space at 260 Utah Street.

Hosfelt Gallery was among the first to exhibit such critically acclaimed artists as Shahzia Sikander, Stefan Kürten, Shirin Neshat, Marco Maggi and Jim Campbell.

In 2011, the gallery exhibited work by the late Beat artist Jay DeFeo which was the first exhibition of her work on the West Coast in fifteen years.

Artists represented
Hosfelt Gallery represents emerging to established local and international contemporary artists, including: Liliana Porter, Russell Crotty, Jim Campbell, John O'Reilly, Marco Maggi, Michael Light, Stefan Kürten, Alan Rath, and William T. Wiley.

Since its inception, a focus of Hosfelt's program has been emerging artists. These include Andrew Schoultz, Rina Banerjee, Anoka Faruqee, Emil Lukas, Gideon Rubin, Jutta Haeckel, Driss Ouadahi, Julie Chang, Chris Ballantyne, and Lordy Rodriguez.

References

External links 
 

Art museums and galleries in San Francisco
1996 establishments in California
Art galleries established in 1996
South of Market, San Francisco